The Puerto Rico national baseball team, also known as Team Rubio is the national baseball team of Puerto Rico. The men's senior team is currently ranked 13th in the world. Puerto Rico is the incumbent Pan American and Central American/Caribbean champion, as well as the World Baseball Classic runner-up. The team will compete against Israel, the Dominican Republic, Venezuela and Nicaragua in the 2023 World Baseball Classic in March 2023 in Miami, Florida.

After debuting in the amateur predecessor to the Baseball World Cup, the team won its first medal by finishing second in 1947, a performance that it repeated the following year. In 1951, Puerto Rico became the world baseball champion by winning the event. The team went on to gather six more medals during the tournament's existence, finishing second twice and third four times.

Puerto Rico was an inaugural member of the World Baseball Classic, making its debut in the first edition. The team has advanced to the second round in all of its appearances, in the process becoming the first team to score mercy rule wins over Cuba and the United States. In the 2013 World Baseball Classic, Puerto Rico became the second team from the Western Hemisphere to advance to the final, eliminating two-time defending world champion Japan in the semifinals before finishing as the event's runner-up. The team has also participated in several other international competitions, such as the Central American and Caribbean Games, the Pan American Games, Americas Baseball Cup, Intercontinental Cup, and Haarlem Baseball Week, winning medals in most.

Baseball World Cup era

Early years of amateur baseball
Puerto Rico made its debut at the Baseball World Cup, then known as the "Amateur World Series" in 1940, only two years after the creation of the Liga de Béisbol Profesional Roberto Clemente (LBPPR), which at the moment was an amateur league. Like all of the other expansion teams, they finished in the bottom half of the table, tied with Mexico with a record of 2-10. The following year the team repeated this performance, finishing tied with El Salvador. Between 1942 and 1943, Puerto Rico did not participate due to the ongoing World War II to which several LBPPR players were drafted. The team returned in 1944, but finished tied with Nicaragua with a record of 1-6. Puerto Rico declined participation in the 1945 Amateur World Series, joining Mexico and Cuba in absence.

World Championship
As the LBPPR expanded and became more organized, the quality of players composing the Puerto Rican national team improved. Returning in 1947, Puerto Rico won the silver medal, having entered the round robin tied with a record of 6-2, defeating Nicaragua to advance before losing to the host, Colombia, in the finals. Puerto Rico went 6-1 in the round-robin but lost 11-1 and 2-1 to the Dominicans in the best-of-3 finals. They won their second straight Silver Medal. M. Ruiz tied for the most doubles (4) and most triples (2). In 1950, the team finished the regular phase of the tournament tied with the Dominican Republic and Cuba for the first place with a record of 9-2, the team defeated Cuba and lost to the Dominican Republic during the round robin phase. However, the Federación Internacional de Béisbol Aficionado (FIBA) ruled that several players that had joined the team were ineligible to play, ruling several key victories "forfeits" and dropping it out of the podium. This incident was the result of the LBPPR from amateur to professional a few years earlier.

In 1951, Puerto Rico earned a record of 7-3 in the regular stage, handing Cuba its only defeat in the first games. After advancing, the team went undefeated with wins over Cuba and Venezuela to secure the gold medal. The team was headlined by Sotero Ortiz who scored more runs (21) and stole more bases (10) than anyone else, while teammate Ramon Maldonado hit 8 doubles to lead the statistic. In 1952, Puerto Rico went 7-3, including 2-2 in the final round to take bronze medal. They were the only team to beat Cuba in the finals. W. Figueredo led in triples (3) while J.R. Garcia led in homers (2) and steals (7). Sotero Ortiz tied for the most doubles (4) and runs (13). Due to the improving quality of its players, Puerto Rico soon began experiencing the loss of its best players to the professional leagues at a very young age, including Roberto Clemente and Orlando Cepeda. In 1953, the team finished 6th with a record of 5-5. However, Félix Torres drove in 15 runs to lead the Series.

By the time that the series resumed in 1963, Major League Baseball had become the primary employer of Puerto Rican talent, making them ineligible to play in the Amateur World Series and the team did not participate in this edition. Back for the tournament in 1965, Puerto Rico won Bronze with a 5-3 record. Andres Cruz led the Series in average (.485), hits (16) and RBI (8). Pitcher Efrain Contreras set an Amateur World Series record by striking out 19 against the Netherlands Antilles. After another hiatus of four years, the event resumed in 1969, which saw Panama, Puerto Rico, Colombia and Nicaragua all tied for 5th with 4-6 records. Luis Mercado led the tournament in doubles (6) and tied for the most triples (3). In 1970, Puerto Rico won the bronze medal with a record of 9-2. Ramón Ortiz hit the most home runs (3) in the competition.

FIBA vs. FEMBA; unique dual medallist
In 1971, Puerto Rico finished tied with Nicaragua in the third place with a record of 6-3, but did not receive the bronze medal due to their individual series. Carlos Lowell led all pitchers with 3 wins. In 1972, Dominican Republic, Puerto Rico and Chinese Taipei tied for 6th, all with 9-6 marks. The team was managed by Roberto Clemente (only weeks prior to his death) and featured a no-hitter by Sandalio Quinonez against Costa Rica. In 1973, Puerto Rico participated in two versions of the Amateur World Series due to internal conflicts in the sport, in the Federación Internacional de Béisbol Aficionado version, the team won the silver medal with a record of 10-3, with two of those loses coming at the hands of eventual winner, Cuba. J. Fontanez led in average (.432). The team was managed by Vic Power. A splinter cell of the national team won the bronze at the event's Federación Mundial de Béisbol Amateur version with a record of 8-2. Puerto Rico is the only participant to win medals in both of the 1973 events. Eventually the FIBA and FEMBA merged and the event had only one sanctioning body, the International Amateur Baseball Association (IABF). In 1974, Puerto Rico finished tied for fourth place at the Amateur World Series along Canada, Italy, Chinese Taipei and the Dominican Republic. In the 1976 World Amateur Series, Puerto Rico won Silver with an 8-2 round-robin before leaving the tournament prior to the final round. J.L. de Leon led the tournament with a 0.00 ERA. After missing the 1978 edition of the World Amateur Series, the team came back in 1980, but finished tied in the 7th place with Venezuela with a 4-7 record. After missing out another version of the Amateur World Series, the team returned in 1984, finishing behind Panama with a record of 6-7, despite gathering a 54-46 advantage in runs. Mariano Quinones (2-0, 2.48) was their most effective pitcher. The top hitter was 1B Luis Fontanez (.353/.400/.569). Future MLB player Hector Villanueva was part of the roster, but had an unsuccessful tournament going 2 for 13 with a double and no walks. In the 1986 Amateur World Series, Puerto Rico tied for 7th at 5-6, despite outscoring opponents 56-45. Roberto Santana (.369) led the Series with 6 stolen bases. Eddie Rodriguez (1.28) had two saves. By 1988, the Amateur World Series became known as the Baseball World Cup and Puerto Rico beat both No. 3 Taiwan and No. 4 Japan and lost to No. 1 Cuba by just one run. However, losses to Canada, Nicaragua and South Korea kept the team out of the final four. CF Ángel Morales (.395/.490/.737, 14 R, 14 RBI) and DH Helson Rodriguez (.300/.462/.650) guided the offensive charge. Victor L. Martinez was 0-1 with a 1.80 ERA, the lowest on the staff.

Migration of MLB All-Stars and fallout
Beginning during the last years of the 1980s and extending throughout the 1990s, Puerto Rico saw a major increase in its production of high-caliber players, with a crop that included Iván Rodríguez, Roberto Alomar, Bernie Williams, Rubén Sierra, Jorge Posada, Juan González, Carlos Delgado, Edgar Martínez and Carlos Beltrán among several others. This fact severely limited the quantity of talent available for the national baseball team, due to the protective behavior exhibited by the MLB teams that signed these players since their teenage years. In the 1990 Baseball World Cup, Puerto Rico went 7-2 but finished 4th thanks to the format. They were 4th with 52 runs and second in ERA (2.89). 1B Efrain Garcia (.351/.385/.568, 7 RBI), All-Star CF Ángel Morales (.417/.463/.556, 8 R, 10 RBI) and DH Helson Rodriguez (.371/.385/.714, 3 HR, 11 RBI) paced the offense. Headlining a fine staff was Jesus I. Feliciano (1-0, 0.56). In 1994, Puerto Rico finished with a 3-4 record, with two close one-run losses (3-2 to Panama and 4-3 to the Netherlands). They hit .305 as a team, fifth in that tournament. Top performers were 1B Efrain Garcia (.448/.484/.724, 8 RBI in 7 games), C Jose Lorenzana (.400/.455/.500), RF Joel Perez (.318/.348/.682) and P Nelson Sanchez (1-1, 2.25). After being absent from two World Cups, the team returned in 2005 but Puerto Rico Puerto Rico, managed by Bert Peña, went 6-5 despite being outscored overall, 60-56. They finished 8th overall. Randy Ruiz (.346/.452/.654), CF Jesus Feliciano (.378/.410/.649, 10 R, 9 RBI) and Edwards Guzman (.343/.375/.543) led the offense However, former MLB player Angel Echevarria had a weak performance with averages of .083/.241/.125. Orlando Román (2-0, 0.50) was their clear top starter as 4 pitchers had ERAs over 8.

Puerto Rico debuted in the inaugural World Baseball Classic by hosting Pool C on March 7, 2006, and defeating Panama with a score of 2-1. The team followed this by winning their second game over the Netherlands, 8–3. Puerto Rico closed the first round by winning Pool C with a 12–2 mercy rule victory over the defending world champion, Cuba. The team opened the second round by defeating the Dominican Republic 7–1. However, the team lost its next game to Venezuela 6–0. Puerto Rico was eliminated with a 4-3 loss in a rematch with Cuba.

2008–2011
Puerto Rico began this Olympic cycle participating in the 2008 America Baseball Cup. The team debuted on September 26, 2008, defeating Mexico 2:1, this game was won by Josué Matos. Puerto Rico concluded the tournament's first round undefeated, with victories over Brazil (6:3), Aruba (7:0) and Guatemala (8:0). In the first two games, Andy González scored four doubles and Carlos Rivera hit his second home run of the round. In the game against Aruba, Orlando Román threw a perfect game over seven innings. In the second round, Puerto Rico defeated Panama (9:4) to qualify for the 2009 Baseball World Cup. On the second date, the team lost their only game of the tournament to Venezuela (5:4). In the next game, the team defeated Netherlands Antilles by ten runs (14:4). Puerto Rico won the 2008 Americas Baseball Cup on October 5, 2008, defeating Nicaragua in the final.

Puerto Rico hosted Pool D of the 2009 World Baseball Classic, debuting with a 7-0 victory over Panama. In its second game, the team defeated the Netherlands 3-1. Both teams met in an immediate rematch to determine the group winner, which Puerto Rico won with scores of 5-0. The team opened the second round by giving the United States its first mercy rule loss, 11-1. Puerto Rico next played Venezuela, losing 2-0. Facing the United States in an elimination game, Puerto Rico lost 6-5 after losing the lead during the final inning. Iván Rodríguez was selected the All-WBC team catcher.

For the Baseball World Cup, Puerto Rico, once again led by Eduardo Pérez, created a roster composed of mostly professional players, including several Major League Baseball athletes. The final cut included infielders Alex Cintrón, Rubén Gotay, Melvin Falú, Carlos Rivera and Angel Sánchez; catchers Orlando Mercado, Jr., Stephen Morales and Raúl Casanova; pitchers Luis Atilano, Mario Santiago, José Santiago, Orlando Román, Juan Padilla, Angel García, Richard Rodríguez, Miguel Mejía, Alexander Woodson, Nelvin Fuentes, Melvin Pizarro and Efraín Nieves as well as outfielders Miguel Negrón, Luis Matos y Miguel Abreu. José Valentín was selected to perform as both infielder and outfielder. Javier Valentín and Juan González were evaluated, but excluded from the final cut due to previous injuries. The fact that most of the roster was professional received some criticism from the amateur circuit. Journalist Duldin Meléndez of Periodico La Cordillera wrote in a piece that "[Pérez] is not familiar with the [amateur] players and has not even seen them play" expressing a similar concern about the Federation's president, Israel Roldán. Juan Carlos Díaz, infielder of the Bravos de Cidra in Béisbol AA, openly expressed disappointment when he did not receive an invitation, noting that he deserved it after leading the Liga Caribe division with an average of .632 and the league's final in offensive. Making its debut on September 10, 2009, Puerto Rico's first opponent is Cuba.

For the 2010 Central American and Caribbean Games, the number of players per roster was limited to 20. Consequently, players such as Juan González and José Valentín were not included in the final cut. Carlos Delgado was included in the preliminary list, but was unable to compete due to injury. The team was mostly composed of professional players such as Víctor Raúl González, Orlando Mercado, Jorge Jiménez, Philip Cuadrado, Adrián Ortiz, Efraín Nieves, Ricard Rodríguez Nick Ortiz, Armando Ríos, Christopher Amador, Edwards Guzmán and Mario Santiago, but also included three amateurs, Antonio Acevedo, Joycet Feliciano and Manuel Romero. Amateur pitcher Jean Ortega was a last minute addition due to an injury suffered by Acevedo. Puerto Rico debuted with a victory over Guatemala in seven innings. The following night the team recorded its second victory, 3:2, over Venezuela, in a game that extended to one extra inning. Efraín Nieves debuted with a shutout victory over Panama, allowing only one hit. Puerto Rico was the leader in its group, closing the first round with a 6:0 victory over the United States Virgin Islands. However, the team lost a 0-1 game to Mexico in the semifinals and the bronze medal to Nicaragua 6-7.

For the 2010 Americas Baseball Cup, Eduardo Pérez assembled an entirely different roster. Several players from the Minor Leagues who were unable to compete at the Central American and Caribbean Games, because this event was not sanctioned by the IBAF, now joined the pre-selection. Only few players, such as Irving Falú were kept from the CAC team. The most notable addition was González, who was joined by Fernando Cabrera, Kiko Calero, Federico Báez, Saúl Rivera, Ramón Vázquez, Gabriel Martinez, Luis Figueroa, Jorge Padilla, Alex Cora and Christian Colón. Puerto Rico was drafted to Group A, along Argentina, Aruba, Canada, Panama and the Dominican Republic.

Generational shift (2013–2016)

After 2011, the IBAF decided to phase out the Baseball World Cup, with the WBC replacing it as the premier competition in international baseball. During this time frame the team was immersed in a change of the guard, losing MLB All-Stars Iván Rodríguez, Carlos Delgado and Bernie Williams to retirement. As with the previous editions, Puerto Rico hosted the first round of the 2013 Classic. However, this time the team faced different adversaries following an expansion, defeating Spain 3-0 in its debut. Puerto Rico secured classification to the second round by winning a game over Venezuela, 6–3. The team closed the round by losing the seeding game to the Dominican Republic, 4-2. Puerto Rico opened the second round with a 7-1 loss to the United States. The team remained alive by defeating Italy 4-3. In its second consecutive elimination game, Puerto Rico defeated the United States 4-3. Facing the Dominican Republic in another seeding game, the team lost 2-0. Puerto Rico advanced by defeating the defending WBC champion, Japan, with scores of 3-1. In the event finals, the team lost a third contest to the Dominican Republic, 3-0, to finish their participation as the tournament's runner up. Yadier Molina was the All-WBC catcher, while Ángel Pagán and Nelson Figueroa received positions among the outfielders and pitchers.

The date of the 2014 Central American and Caribbean Games has opened the door for Puerto Rico and several other teams to reinforce themselves with MLB players, raising the competitive level of what is usually a low caliber tournament. The team finished fourth.

Regional championships (2017–2021)
Puerto Rico repeated their previous WBC performance in 2017, finishing as the tournament's runner-up.

For secondary competitions, former MLB player Juan González was named as manager making his debut at the 2018 Central American and Caribbean Games. Unable to request athletes contracted to MLB (or active in MiLB), he assembled a team composed by players active in foreign independent leagues, the local Doble A amateur league and veteran free agents with previous professional experience, making the final cut following a preparatory tournament. González made his official debut as manager in a 5:3 victory over Venezuela. In its next outing, Puerto Rico defeated Cuba 8:1 to snap a 36-year (43-game) winning streak at the CACG. This was followed by wins over the Dominican Republic (4:1) and Mexico (7:1). On July 26, 2018, Puerto Rico defeated second-place Colombia 2:1 to clinch the first place of the round robin. This was followed by inconsequential losses to Panama (2:5) and Guatemala (9:10). González closed his first participation as manager by leading Puerto Rico to the Central American and Caribbean gold medal.

Once again managed by González, Puerto Rico won the gold medal of the 2019 Pan American Games, going undefeated and besting Canada 6:1 in the final. The team tried but failed to qualify for the 2020 Olympics at the eight-team Americas Qualifying Event on May 31 through June 5, 2021.

Abridged Olympic circle (2022–2024)

Despite being the defending CACG champion, Puerto Rico had to play in the Caribbean Baseball Cup to qualify for the 2023 tournament. Facing issues with the Liga de Béisbol Profesional Roberto Clemente due to itinerary conflicts, González was able to assemble a team composed by players from the local Béisbol Superior Doble A amateur league, beginning the participation with a 7:1 loss to defending champion Curaçao. Puerto Rico then won consecutive shut out games over Cuba (6:0) and the United States Virgin Islands (6:0). The team advanced in the first place of the global standings by defeating the Bahamas with scores of 14:2. It won a rematch (9:3) in the semifinals to contend for the title and qualify for the CACG. Puerto Rico defeated Cuba in the finals with scores of 9:4 to win the IV Caribbean Baseball Cup.

The team will compete against Israel, the Dominican Republic, Venezuela and Nicaragua in the 2023 World Baseball Classic in March 2023 in Miami, Florida.

Tournament record

World Baseball Classic

Olympic Games

Baseball World Cup
 Gold: 1951
 Silver: 1947, 1948, 1973, 1976
 Bronze: 1952, 1965, 1970, 1973

Intercontinental Cup
 Silver: 1973
 Bronze: 1989

Americas Baseball Cup
 Gold: 2008

Pan American Games
 Gold: 2019
 Silver: 1959, 1991
 Bronze: 1967, 1979, 1987, 1995

Central American and Caribbean Games
 Gold: 1959, 2002, 2018
 Silver: 1962, 1966, 1990
 Bronze: 1974, 1978, 1993

Caribbean Baseball Cup
 Gold: 2022

World University Baseball Championship
2006 – 6th place

Haarlem Baseball Week
1992 – 5th place
2012 –

Results and fixtures
The following is a list of professional baseball match results currently active in the latest version of the WBSC World Rankings, as well as any future matches that have been scheduled.

Legend

2019

2022

2023

See also

 Baseball in Puerto Rico
 World Baseball Classic
 Olympic baseball
 World Cup
 Americas Baseball Cup
 Pan American Games
 Intercontinental Cup
 Central American and Caribbean Games
 IBAF World Rankings
 List of players from Puerto Rico in MLB
 Baseball awards
 2013 World Baseball Classic rosters
 2009 World Baseball Classic rosters
 2006 World Baseball Classic rosters

References

External links

Latino Baseball
Major League Baseball
Series del Caribe, Las (Spanish)
International Baseball Federation Baseball World Cup home page
Official Olympic Reports (digitized copies online)
International Olympic Committee results database
World Baseball Classic
Confederación Panamericana de Béisbol

Baseball
National baseball teams
National